The 1958 Arizona Wildcats baseball team represented the University of Arizona in the 1958 NCAA University Division baseball season. The Wildcats played their home games at UA Field. The team was coached by Frank Sancet in his 9th year at Arizona.

The Wildcats won the District VI Playoff to advanced to the College World Series, where they were defeated by the Southern California Trojans.

Roster

Schedule 

! style="" | Regular Season
|- valign="top" 

|- align="center" bgcolor="#ccffcc"
| 1 || March 8 || Marine Corps Base Camp Pendleton || UA Field • Tucson, Arizona || 8–2 || 1–0 || –
|- align="center" bgcolor="#ccffcc"
| 2 || March 10 ||  || UA Field • Tucson, Arizona || 10–4 || 2–0 || –
|- align="center" bgcolor="#ccffcc"
| 3 || March 11 || Sul Ross || UA Field • Tucson, Arizona || 7–6 || 3–0 || –
|- align="center" bgcolor="#ccffcc"
| 4 || March 14 ||  || UA Field • Tucson, Arizona || 18–1 || 4–0 || 1–0
|- align="center" bgcolor="#ccffcc"
| 5 || March 15 || New Mexico || UA Field • Tucson, Arizona || 9–5 || 5–0 || 2–0
|- align="center" bgcolor="#ccffcc"
| 6 || March 18 || Colorado State College || UA Field • Tucson, Arizona || 17–3 || 6–0 || 2–0
|- align="center" bgcolor="#ccffcc"
| 7 || March 19 || Colorado State College || UA Field • Tucson, Arizona || 15–1 || 7–0 || 2–0
|- align="center" bgcolor="#ccffcc"
| 8 || March 21 ||  || UA Field • Tucson, Arizona || 10–6 || 8–0 || 2–0
|- align="center" bgcolor="#ccffcc"
| 9 || March 22 || Air Force || UA Field • Tucson, Arizona || 10–6 || 9–0 || 2–0
|- align="center" bgcolor="#ccffcc"
| 10 || March 22 || Air Force || UA Field • Tucson, Arizona || 11–3 || 10–0 || 2–0
|- align="center" bgcolor="#ffcccc"
| 11 || March 24 ||  || UA Field • Tucson, Arizona || 5–7 || 10–1 || 2–0
|- align="center" bgcolor="#ccffcc"
| 12 || March 25 || Utah || UA Field • Tucson, Arizona || 14–4 || 11–1 || 2–0
|- align="center" bgcolor="#ccffcc"
| 13 || March 26 || Utah || UA Field • Tucson, Arizona || 5–4 || 12–1 || 2–0
|- align="center" bgcolor="#ccffcc"
| 14 || March 27 ||  || UA Field • Tucson, Arizona || 19–8 || 13–1 || 2–0
|- align="center" bgcolor="#ccffcc"
| 15 || March 28 || Wyoming || UA Field • Tucson, Arizona || 9–1 || 14–1 || 2–0
|- align="center" bgcolor="#ccffcc"
| 16 || March 29 || Wyoming || UA Field • Tucson, Arizona || 14–7 || 15–1 || 2–0
|- align="center" bgcolor="#ccffcc"
| 17 || March 31 ||  || UA Field • Tucson, Arizona || 11–4 || 16–1 || 2–0
|-

|- align="center" bgcolor="#ccffcc"
| 18 || April 1 || Iowa || UA Field • Tucson, Arizona || 8–0 || 17–1 || 2–0
|- align="center" bgcolor="#ccffcc"
| 19 || April 2 || Iowa || UA Field • Tucson, Arizona || 7–6 || 18–1 || 2–0
|- align="center" bgcolor="#ccffcc"
| 20 || April 3 || Iowa || UA Field • Tucson, Arizona || 16–6 || 19–1 || 2–0
|- align="center" bgcolor="#ffcccc"
| 21 || April 5 || Iowa || UA Field • Tucson, Arizona || 7–9 || 19–2 || 2–0
|- align="center" bgcolor="#ffcccc"
| 22 || April 5 || Iowa || UA Field • Tucson, Arizona || 3–8 || 19–3 || 2–0
|- align="center" bgcolor="#ccffcc"
| 23 || April 8 || at  || Unknown • Malibu, California || 5–3 || 20–3 || 2–0
|- align="center" bgcolor="#ccffcc"
| 24 || April 9 || at  || Reeder Field • Los Angeles, California || 2–0 || 21–3 || 2–0
|- align="center" bgcolor="#ccffcc"
| 25 || April 9 || at Cal State Los Angeles || Reeder Field • Los Angeles, California || 4–2 || 22–3 || 2–0
|- align="center" bgcolor="#ffcccc"
| 26 || April 10 || at Pepperdine || Unknown • Malibu, California || 4–8 || 22–4 || 2–0
|- align="center" bgcolor="#ccffcc"
| 27 || April 11 || at  || Joe E. Brown Field • Los Angeles, California || 3–2 || 24–4 || 2–0
|- align="center" bgcolor="#ffcccc"
| 28 || April 12 || at UCLA || Joe E. Brown Field • Los Angeles, California || 3–7 || 23–5 || 2–0
|- align="center" bgcolor="#ccffcc"
| 29 || April 15 || Davis–Monthan Air Force Base || UA Field • Tucson, Arizona || 5–4 || 24–5 || 2–0
|- align="center" bgcolor="#ffcccc"
| 30 || April 19 || at  || Unknown • Tempe, Arizona || 3–7 || 24–6 || 2–1
|- align="center" bgcolor="#ccffcc"
| 31 || April 19 || at Arizona State || Unknown • Tempe, Arizona || 3–2 || 25–6 || 3–1
|- align="center" bgcolor="#ccffcc"
| 32 || April 22 || Davis–Monthan Air Force Base || UA Field • Tucson, Arizona || 11–2 || 26–6 || 3–1
|- align="center" bgcolor="#ccffcc"
| 33 || April 25 || Pepperdine || UA Field • Tucson, Arizona || 5–3 || 27–6 || 3–1
|- align="center" bgcolor="#ffcccc"
| 34 || April 26 || Pepperdine || UA Field • Tucson, Arizona || 14–16 || 27–7 || 3–1
|- align="center" bgcolor="#ccffcc"
| 35 || April 28 || San Diego Marines || UA Field • Tucson, Arizona || 9–4 || 28–7 || 3–1
|- align="center" bgcolor="#ffcccc"
| 36 || April 29 || San Diego Marines || UA Field • Tucson, Arizona || 6–10 || 28–8 || 3–1
|- align="center" bgcolor="#ffcccc"
| 37 || April 30 || Fort Huachuca || UA Field • Tucson, Arizona || 1–5 || 28–9 || 3–1
|-

|- align="center" bgcolor="#ccffcc"
| 38 || May 3 || Arizona State || UA Field • Tucson, Arizona || 10–0 || 29–9 || 4–1
|- align="center" bgcolor="#ccffcc"
| 39 || May 3 || Arizona State || UA Field • Tucson, Arizona || 2–1 || 30–9 || 5–1
|- align="center" bgcolor="#ccffcc"
| 40 || May 6 || Davis–Monthan Air Force Base || UA Field • Tucson, Arizona || 15–0 || 31–9 || 5–1
|- align="center" bgcolor="#ccffcc"
| 41 || May 7 ||  || UA Field • Tucson, Arizona || 9–0 || 32–9 || 6–1
|- align="center" bgcolor="#ccffcc"
| 42 || May 8 || New Mexico A&M || UA Field • Tucson, Arizona || 24–1 || 33–9 || 7–1
|- align="center" bgcolor="#ffcccc"
| 43 || May 9 || Casa Grande || UA Field • Tucson, Arizona || 4–6 || 33–10 || 7–1
|- align="center" bgcolor="#ccffcc"
| 44 || May 12 || Davis–Monthan Air Force Base || UA Field • Tucson, Arizona || 18–2 || 34–10 || 7–1
|- align="center" bgcolor="#ccffcc"
| 45 || May 13 || Davis–Monthan Air Force Base || UA Field • Tucson, Arizona || 17–3 || 35–10 || 7–1
|- align="center" bgcolor="#ccffcc"
| 46 || May 15 || Fort Huachuca || UA Field • Tucson, Arizona || 13–8 || 36–10 || 7–1
|- align="center" bgcolor="#ffcccc"
| 47 || May 17 || Casa Grande || UA Field • Tucson, Arizona || 4–9 || 36–11 || 7–1
|-

|-
|-
! style="" | Postseason
|- valign="top"

|- align="center" bgcolor="#ffcccc"
| 48 || June 5 ||  || UA Field • Tucson, Arizona || 3–14 || 36–12 || 7–1
|- align="center" bgcolor="#ccffcc"
| 49 || June 6 || Texas || UA Field • Tucson, Arizona || 16–4 || 37–12 || 7–1
|- align="center" bgcolor="#ccffcc"
| 50 || June 7 || Texas || UA Field • Tucson, Arizona || 5–2 || 38–12 || 7–1
|-

|- align="center" bgcolor="#ffcccc"
| 51 || June 14 || vs Clemson || Omaha Municipal Stadium • Omaha, Nebraska || 1–4 || 38–13 || 7–1
|- align="center" bgcolor="#ffcccc"
| 52 || June 15 || vs Southern California || Omaha Municipal Stadium • Omaha, Nebraska || 0–4 || 38–14 || 7–1
|-

Awards and honors 
Dick Griesser
First Team All-American American Baseball Coaches Association

Harry Messick
Second Team All-American American Baseball Coaches Association

References 

Arizona Wildcats baseball seasons
Arizona Wildcats baseball
College World Series seasons
Arizona